The Rhamphorhynchoidea forms one of the two suborders of pterosaurs and represents an evolutionary grade of primitive members of flying reptiles. This suborder is paraphyletic unlike the Pterodactyloidea, which arose from within the Rhamphorhynchoidea as opposed to a more distant common ancestor. Because it is not a completely natural grouping, Rhamphorhynchoidea is not used as a formal group in most scientific literature, though some pterosaur scientists continue to use it as an informal grouping in popular works, such as The Pterosaurs: From Deep Time by David Unwin, and in some formal studies. Rhamphorhynchoids were the first pterosaurs to have appeared, in the late Triassic Period (Norian age, about 210 million years ago). Unlike their descendants, the pterodactyloids, most rhamphorhynchoids had teeth and long tails, and most species lacked a bony crest, though several are known to have crests formed from soft tissue like keratin. They were generally small, with wingspans rarely exceeding 2.5 meters, though one specimen alluded to by Alexander Stoyanow would be among the largest pterosaurs of all time with a wingspan of 10 meters, comparable to the largest azhdarchids. However, this alleged giant Jurassic pterosaur specimen is not recorded anywhere outside the original Time article. Nearly all rhamphorhynchoids had become extinct by the end of the Jurassic Period, though some anurognathids persisted to the early Cretaceous. The family Wukongopteridae, which shows a mix of rhamphorhynchoid and pterodactyloid features, is known from the Daohugou Beds which are most commonly dated to the Jurassic, but a few studies give a Cretaceous date. Furthermore, remains of a non-pterodactyloid from the Candeleros Formation extend the presence of basal pterosaurs into at least the early Late Cretaceous.

Classification

Taxonomy
Listing of families and superfamilies within the suborder Rhamphorhynchoidea, after Unwin 2006 unless otherwise noted.
 Order Pterosauria
 Suborder Rhamphorhynchoidea *
Clade Eopterosauria
 Preondactylus
Clade Eudimorphodontimorpha
Austriadactylus
Clade Eudimorphodontia
Peteinosaurus
Family Eudimorphodontidae
Subfamily Eudimorphodontinae
Eudimorphodon
Subfamily Raeticodactylinae
Caviramus
Carniadactylus?
 Family Dimorphodontidae
 Family Anurognathidae
 Superfamily Campylognathoidea
 Family Campylognathoididae
 Family Rhamphorhynchidae
 Subfamily Rhamphorhynchinae
 Subfamily Scaphognathinae
 Rhamphorhynchoids of uncertain relationships (incertae sedis)
 Comodactylus
 Laopteryx
 Parapsicephalus
 Rhamphinion

References

 Unwin, D. M., (2003). "On the phylogeny and evolutionary history of pterosaurs." In Buffetaut, E. & Mazin, J.-M., eds. Evolution and Palaeobiology of Pterosaurs. London: Geological Society of London, Special Publications 217, 2003, pp. 139–190.

Pterosaurs
Paraphyletic groups